Claus Jørgen From (born 26 June 1945) is a former Danish handball player who competed in the 1972 Summer Olympics and in the 1976 Summer Olympics. He played his club handball for IF Stjernen.

In 1972 he was part of the Danish team which finished thirteenth in the Olympic tournament. He played four matches and scored six goals. Four years later he finished eighth with the Danish team in the 1976 Olympic tournament. He played all six matches and scored six goals.

References

1945 births
Living people
Danish male handball players
Olympic handball players of Denmark
Handball players at the 1972 Summer Olympics
Handball players at the 1976 Summer Olympics